Club Deportivo Lealtad de Villaviciosa (English: Loyalty Sporting Club of Villaviciosa) is a Spanish football team based in Villaviciosa, in the autonomous community of Asturias. Founded in 1916, it plays in Tercera División RFEF – Group 2, holding home games at Les Caleyes ground with a capacity of 3,000.

History
Founded in 1916 by a group of young people at the Worker's Athenaeum, Lealtad played in regional leagues until 1990, when it was promoted for the first time to Tercera División. In 1998, with Marcelino García as coach, the club achieved its first promotion ever to Segunda División B after defeating Real Madrid "C", Betanzos CF and Gimnástica Segoviana in the promotion playoffs.

It only remained in the third tier one season and spent fifteen more seasons in Tercera before being promoted again in 2014, after overcoming a critical economic situation in 2012, by beating CD Puertollano in the shootout of the group champions' play-off.

This time, Lealtad avoided relegation after beating Racing Ferrol in the last match of the 2014–15 season by 1–0. In the 2015–16 season, Lealtad achieved a great year with a 10th position, the best ever in the club's history.

After four seasons in the third tier, Lealtad would be relegated to Tercera División in April 2018, after receiving an 8–0 defeat from Bilbao Athletic.

On 24 October 2018, Lealtad achieved their first Asturian Copa Federación by defeating Sporting de Gijón B after a penalty shootout. The team finished the 2018–19 league season without losses in the Group 2, but failed to promote to Segunda División B after failing to beat firstly Getafe B and later Villarrobledo.

Stadium

Lealtad plays its games at Estadio Les Caleyes located next to the river mouth of Villaviciosa. It has a capacity of 3,000 spectators and after its last renovation, the main tribune has 220 seats.

The record attendance was beaten on 24 April 2016, with 4,052 spectators at the club's match of the 2015–16 Segunda División B against Racing de Santander.

Season to season

5 seasons in Segunda División B
25 seasons in Tercera División
1 season in Tercera División RFEF

Current squad

Honours
Tercera División: (6) 1991–92, 1997–98, 1999–2000, 2013–14, 2018–19, 2019-20
Copa Federación de España (Asturias tournament): (1) 2018

Notable players
 Fernando Tocornal
 Paco Fernández
 Alejandro 'Caco' Morán
 José Manuel 'Sietes' Suárez
 Javi Castaño
 Saúl Berjón
 Rubén Uría
 Miguel Vigón
 Pedrín Menéndez

Notable coaches
 Josu Uribe
 Marcelino García
 José Antonio 'Pocholo' Fernández
 Nené Ballina
 Paco Fernández
 Ricardo Bango
 Javi Rozada
 Samu Baños

References

External links
Official website 
Futbolme team profile 
Club & stadium history

Football clubs in Asturias
Association football clubs established in 1916
1916 establishments in Spain